The 4th Light Cruiser Squadron  was a naval formation of Light cruisers of the Royal Navy from 1915 to 1919.

History

World War One
Formed on 15 May 1915 it was then assigned to the Grand Fleet in August 1915 and remained attached the fleet until November 1918.  

At the Battle of Jutland, the 4th Light Cruiser Squadron consisted of four C-Class cruisers HMS Calliope, Constance, Caroline and Comus plus the Arethusa class cruiser HMS Royalist.  At Jutland, HMS Calliope flew the broad pennant as Commodore Le Mesurier's flagship. The 4th Light Cruiser Squadron was initially deployed as an anti-submarine screen directly ahead of the main British battle fleet, with HMS Calliope in the lead followed, in order, by Constance, Comus, Royalist and Caroline. Shortly after 8:05p.m. 31 May, the First Division of the 4th Light Cruiser Squadron (Calliope, Constance and Comus), engaged with German destroyers and then sighted the main German battle fleet at which Calliope launched a torpedo before retiring under heavy German fire.

Interwar
In 1919 the squadron was assigned to the East Indies Station.

Commodores/Rear-Admirals commanding
Post holders included:

References
Footnotes

Sources
  Corbett, Julian S. (1923) Naval Operations. Official History of the War. Vol.III. London: Longmans, Green & Co.
  Harper, J. E. T. (2016) The Jutland Scandal: The Truth about the First World War's Greatest Sea Battle. New York: Skyhorse Publishing, ISBN 978-1-5107-0871-6.
  Lambert, Andrew D.; Blyth, Robert J.; Rüger, Jan (2011). The Dreadnought and the Edwardian Age. Farnham, England: Ashgate Publishing, Ltd. .
 Mackie, Colin, (2018), British Armed Services between 1860 and the present day — Royal Navy - Senior Appointments, http://www.gulabin.com/.
 Watson, Dr Graham. (2015) "Royal Navy Organisation and Ship Deployment, Inter-War Years 1914-1918". www.naval-history.net. Gordon Smith.
 Watson, Dr Graham. (2015) "Royal Navy Organisation and Ship Deployment, Inter-War Years 1919-1939". www.naval-history.net. Gordon Smith.

External links

Light Cruiser squadrons of the Royal Navy
Military units and formations of the Royal Navy in World War I